A safety net hospital is a type of medical center in the United States that by legal obligation or mission provides healthcare for individuals regardless of their insurance status (the United States does not have a policy of universal health care) or ability to pay.  This legal mandate forces safety net hospitals (SNHs) to serve all populations. Such hospitals typically serve a proportionately higher number of uninsured, Medicaid, Medicare, Children's Health Insurance Program (CHiP), low-income, and other vulnerable individuals than their "non-safety net hospital" counterpart. Safety net hospitals are not defined by their ownership terms; they can be either publicly or privately owned. The missions of safety net hospitals are rather, to focus and emphasize their devotion to providing the best possible care for those who are barred from health care due to the various possible adverse circumstances. These circumstances mostly revolve around problems with financial payments, insurance plans, or health conditions. Safety net hospitals are known for maintaining an open-door policy for their services.

Some safety net hospitals even offer high-cost services like burn care, trauma care, neonatal treatments, and inpatient behavioral health.  Some also provide training for healthcare professionals. The Health and Hospital Corporation in NYC, Cook County Health and Hospital System in Chicago, and Parkland Health & Hospital System in Dallas are three of the United States' largest safety net hospitals.

History 
The presence of philanthropic medical institutions during the 19th century pre-date the modern American safety net hospital. These hospitals were funded by religious groups or wealthy benefactors, and their target population was the poor. However, towards the turn of the century, these institutions began transitioning into for-profit organizations, as they began to accept patients from all socioeconomic backgrounds. Towards 1922, as these businesses grew, revenue from patient care accounted for 65.2% of the total revenue for these community hospitals. Along with the introduction of private insurance, Medicare, and Medicaid during the 1980s, by the time 1994 arrived, 94% of the revenue came from patient care. However, in 1996, approximately 43 million people (one-fifth of the U.S. population under age 65) had no medical insurance and an additional 29 million were underinsured. These numbers were also expected to rise in the next decade. This led to the advent of what we consider a safety net hospital. Hospitals were already practicing uncompensated health care during the 1980s, with the help of state funding and Disproportionate Share Hospital (DSH) programs, in order to provide medical treatment to the uninsured and the underinsured in urban cities. However, this practice became more commonplace when the state of health care began to look difficult.

Financing a safety net hospital

Safety net hospitals oftentimes find themselves in difficult financial positions due to the vulnerable financial state of the patients and lack of sufficient federal, state and local funding; safety net hospitals have high rates of Medicaid and Medicare payers (Medicaid has unreliable/insufficient processes of government to hospital repayment) and a large proportion of safety net hospital patients serve traditionally low income and marginalized/vulnerable populations. There is a complex array of public funding that comes to safety net hospitals (as being legally defined as a safety net hospital entitles these entities to financial compensation to overcome the cost of medical expenses not paid for by patients) mostly through Medicaid Disproportionate Share Hospital Payments, Medicaid Upper Payment Limit Payments, Medicaid Indirect Medical Education Payments, and state/local indigent health programs. However, these financial entities created to sustain safety net hospitals in repayments are often not enough. According to the National Rural Health Association, 83 rural hospitals have closed since 2010 due to the substantial financial pressure. In 2013, hospitals across the United States generated $44.6 billion in uncompensated care costs; uncompensated care costs are costs accrued from services that the hospitals provided to patients that were not able to pay and that also went unpaid by government entities. Additionally, there tends to be a lack of socioeconomic development and a lack of health care providers (both general and specialized) in the geographical regions where safety net hospitals tend to be located; this observation is made by Waitzkin and he refers to these facts as part of the social and structural "contradictions" that safety net hospitals face further negatively impact there financial stability and care performance. Besides, many of the level I trauma centers are within safety net hospitals and their financial stability is highly affected by policy changes. In a study, they found that county SNHs were the last in net revenue income compared to non-profit SNHs and non-SNHs ($41.6 million vs $111.4 million vs $287.1 million, respectively). Although ACA has changed the financial situation of SNHs, county SNHs still faced a negative margins in 2015. However, for many hospital types, the net patient revenue increased.

Prospects for safety net hospitals under the Patient Protection and Affordable Care Act

Under statute, Medicaid and Medicare issue disproportionate share hospital (DSH) payments that offset hospitals’ expenditures for uncompensated care. These payments are intended to improve access for Medicaid recipients and uninsured patients, as well as to shore up the financial stability of safety-net hospitals. Prior to the Patient Protection and Affordable Care Act (ACA, also known as "Obamacare"), the Medicare portion of the program has already been limited, and under the ACA the Medicaid portion of the program is also scheduled to be restricted. This was built into the law under the assumption that the amount of uncompensated care would decline substantially under the ACA due to expanded coverage. However, coverage did not expand as much as anticipated in many states due to the unanticipated choice not to expand Medicaid access under the Act (a result of National Federation of Independent Business v. Sebelius). An additional issue with Obamacare and safety net hospitals arises from the coverage gap for those who have too high of an income to qualify for Medicaid but have too low of an income to afford a private plan; it is projected that even with the implementation of the health care law in 2016, roughly 30 million people are still expected to be without insurance coverage and find service in safety net hospitals.  Another issue revolves around the fact that hospitals are required to provide care for patients in the emergency department, even if the person cannot pay or is an illegal immigrant.

Safety net hospitals under the Trump Administration

The American Health Care Act of 2017 (AHCA) repealed part of the Patient Protection and Affordable Care Act in such that it cut Medicaid coverage for lower-income Americans and would effectively stop ACA's Medicaid expansion, which is estimated to result in lost coverage for 24 million people by 2026. In addition, it places a limit on federal funding that states can receive to cover health insurance to millions of low-income patients. These federal cuts and increased enrollment criteria for federal welfare programs will create an inevitable cost shift on patients and will make it more difficult for Americans to be able to participate and receive aid from federal programs, especially with less money allocated to these programs.  Less money allocated to federal programs and the simultaneous repeals to Obamacare will lead to less patients receiving financial help and qualifying for insurance programs, which means they will have to pay more money out of pocket. It is estimated that there will be 15 million or more fewer individuals insured with "Trumpcare" than with Obamacare. This will directly impact safety net hospitals because the number of patients without insurance will increase at safety net hospitals but in turn, safety net hospitals will also be suffering a decrease in financial support from the federal government and will not be able to absorb as many costs for these patients. The aforementioned proposed acts will place financial burdens and operational constraints on both patients and safety net hospitals. It is projected that under the AHCA, hospitals in both expanded Medicaid and nonexpanded states are predicted to have negative operating margins by 2026, which endangers the quality of patient care and the low-income communities, and ultimately, threatens closure of the hospital.

Types of safety net providers

Federally Qualified Health Centers (FQHCs) 
Federally Qualified Health Center are public and private non-profit health care organizations that meet federally mandated requirements to provide comprehensive and appropriate health care services to medically underserved populations. They must also adjust service fees to patient capacity to pay, have an ongoing qualify assurance program, and have a governing board of directors. In turn, FQHCs receive reimbursements from Medicaid through their Prospective Payment System (PPS).  They can also apply for the Health Center Program grant from the U.S. Department of Health and Human Resources and Services Administration.

Federally Qualified Health Centers Look-Alikes (FQHCs look-alikes) 
FQHCs that meet all the federal health center program requirements but don't receive health center grant funding are called FQHC look-alikes.  These FQHCs are typically non-profit community health centers and regional clinical associations.

Rural Health Centers (RHC) 
Rural Health Centers are public, private, or non-profit health centers that provide primary care to Medicaid and Medicare populations in rural areas. RHC status is designated by the Centers for Medicare and Medicaid Services, providing enhanced reimbursements rates for services. A health center cannot be both an RHC and a FQHC.

Disproportionate Share Hospitals (DSH) 
Disproportionate share hospital are characterized by a significantly high number of low-income patients that is disproportionate.  These hospitals do not receive payment for their services and are not reimbursement by Medicare, Medical, health insurance, or the Children's Health Insurance Program.  State submit independent certified audits along with an annual report detailing how their payments to each DSH Hospital. After doing so they states receive Federal Financial Participation (FFP), an annual allotment.

Community Health Centers 
Community Health Centers are clinics with a mission to provide care to low-income populations regardless of their ability to pay.  However, they do not have to meet any federal requirements because they do not receive federal funding or reimbursements from medicare or medical. They usually operate through donations.

List of safety net hospitals in the United States

Alabama 

 DCH Regional Health System
 East Alabama Medical Center - Lanier
Princeton Baptist Medical Center
St. Vincent's East Hospital
UAB Hospital

Arizona 

 Valleywise Health (Formerly Maricopa Integrated Health System)
 Northern Arizona Healthcare
 Flagstaff Medical Center
 Verde Valley Medical Center
 Yuma Regional Medical Center

Arkansas 

 University of Arkansas for Medical Sciences

California 
The 21 hospitals part of California's health care safety net system is represented by the California Association of Public Hospitals and Health Systems.  These 21 hospitals are 6% of all the hospitals in California but provide care for 80% of the state's population.  40% of their total hospital services is for uninsured patients and 35% is for Medicaid Patients.

Alameda Health System
 Alameda Hospital
 Fairmont Hospital 
 Highland Hospital
 John George Psychiatric Hospital
 San Leandro Hospital
Arrowhead Regional Medical Center
 City and County of San Francisco Department of Public Health
 Laguna Honda Hospital and Rehabilitation Center 
 Zuckerberg San Francisco General Hospital and Trauma Center
 Contra Costa Regional Medical Center
 Kern Medical 
 Los Angeles County Department of Health Services
 Children's Hospital Los Angeles
 Harbor-UCLA Medical Center
 High Desert Regional Health Center
 LAC + USC Medical Center
 Olive View-UCLA Medical Center
 Rancho Los Amigos National Rehabilitation Center
 Natividad Medical Center
 Riverside University Health System - Medical Center
 San Joaquin GeneralHospital
 San Mateo Medical Center
 Santa Clara Valley Health & Hospital System
Santa Clara Valley Medical Center
 University of California
 Shiley Eye Center
 UC Davis Medical Center
 UC Irvine Medical Center
 UC San Diego Health System
 UCSF Benioff Children's Hospital
 UCSF Medical Center at Mount Zion
 Ventura County Health Care Agency
 Santa Paula Hospital
 Ventura County Medical Center

Colorado 

 Denver Health Medical Center

Connecticut 

 Stamford Health

Delaware 

 Christiana Care Health Systems

District of Columbia 
 Children's National Hospital
 Howard University Hospital
 MedStar Washington Hospital Center

Florida 

 Baycare Health System
 Broward Health
 Halifax Health
 Health Care District of Palm Beach County
 Jackson Health System
 Lawnwood Hospital of Fort Pierce
 Lee Health
 Memorial Healthcare System
 Orlando Health
 Tampa General Hospital
 University of Florida Health
 UF Health Jacksonville
 UF Health Shands Children's Hospital
 UF Health Shands Hospital
 UF Health Shands Psychiatric Hospital
 UF Health Shands Rehab Hospital

Georgia 

  Grady Health System
 Atrium Health Navicent Medical Center
 Augusta University Medical Center
 South Georgia Medical Center

Idaho 

 St. Luke's Health System

Illinois 

 Cook County Health & Hospital System
 Norwegian American Hospital
 Sinai Health System
 The University of Chicago Medicine
 Bernard Mitchell Hospital
 Comer Children's Hospital
 University of Illinois Hospital & Health Sciences System
 Roseland Community Hospital
 Loretto Hospital

Indiana 

 Health and Hospital Corporation of Marion County
 Indiana University Health
 Eskenazi Health

Iowa 

 Broadlawns Medical Center

Kansas 

 The University of Kansas Health System

Kentucky 

 UK HealthCare

Louisiana 

 University Medical Center New Orleans

Maryland 

 Bon Secours Hospital

Massachusetts 

 Baystate Health Medical Center
 Boston Medical Center
 Cambridge Health Alliance
 Signature Healthcare Brockton Hospital
 UMass Memorial Health care
 Lawrence General Hospital

Michigan 

 Henry Ford Allegiance Health
 Hurley Medical Center

Minnesota 

 Hennepin County Medical Center
 Regions Hospital HealthPartners

Mississippi 

 The University of Mississippi Health Care

Missouri 

 Saint Louis University Hospital
 Truman Medical Centers
 University of Missouri Health Care

Montana 

 Benefis Health System

Nebraska 

 Nebraska Medicine

Nevada 

 University Medical Center of Southern Nevada

New Jersey 
 Carepoint Health
 Cooper University Health Care
 RWJBarnabas Health
 St. Joseph's Regional Medical Center
 University Hospital

New Mexico 

 University of New Mexico Hospital

New York 

 Erie County Medical Center
 Nassau University Medical Center (NuHealth)
 NYC Health + Hospitals
 St. John's Episcopal Hospital 
 SUNY-STATE University of New York
The Brooklyn Hospital Center

North Carolina 

 Atrium Health
 Vidant Health
  WakeMedHealth & Hospitals

Ohio 

 Cleveland Clinic Foundation (some affiliated hospitals, not the main hospital)
 Summa Health Systems
 The MetroHealth System
 The Ohio State University Wexner Medical Center
 UC Health

Oregon 

 Oregon Health & Science University

Pennsylvania 

 Einstein Healthcare Network
 Temple Health

Rhode Island 

 Care New England Health System
 Rhode Island Hospital

South Carolina 

 Greenville Health System
 Medical University of South Carolina - University Hospital
 Spartanburg Regional Healthcare System

Tennessee 

 Erlanger Health System
 Nashville General Hospital at Meharry
 Regional One Health
 University of Tennessee Medical Center

Texas 

 Harris Health System
 JPS Health Network
 Parkland Health & Hospital System
 The University of Texas Medical Branch
 University Health System
 University Medical Center of El Paso
 UT Health Northeast

Utah 

 University of Utah Health Care

Vermont 

 UVM Health Network

Virginia 

 Carilion Clinic
 University of Virginia Health System
 Virginia Commonwealth University Health System

Washington 

 UW Medicine
 Mason General Hospital

West Virginia 

 West Virginia University Medicine
 Berkeley MedicalCenter
 Camden Clark Medical Center
 Chestnut Ridge Center
 Jefferson Medical Center
 Ruby Memorial Hospital
 United Hospital Center
 WVU Children's hospital

Patient experience in safety net hospitals

Studies have shown that safety net hospitals, when compared to non-safety net hospitals (and other healthcare institutions), do not perform as well in overall patient care and patient experience ratings. In response to these critiques, some safety net hospitals have begun to offer customer service trainings, conduct employee evaluations and advocate for policy changes that could improve the patient experience.  Hospitals are trying to increase their compassion and quality of care in order to satisfy patient experiences. Patients with a satisfying care experience are more likely to recommend hospitals to others.

References

External links
 http://healthleadersmedia.com/page-1/COM-294179/How-SafetyNet-Hospitals-Are-Improving-the-Patient-Experience
 http://health.usnews.com/health-news/hospital-of-tomorrow/articles/2015/05/19/safety-net-hospitals-worry-about-obamacare-cuts
 http://literacynet.org/hls/hls_conf_materials/WhatIsASafetyNetHospital.pdf
 http://www.nhpf.org/uploads/Handouts/Coughlin-slides_04-17-15.pdf

Healthcare in the United States